Luis Figueroa may refer to:
 Luis Figueroa (baseball)
 Luis Figueroa (singer)
 Luis Pedro Figueroa, Chilean footballer
 Luis Pérez Figueroa, Mexican general

See also
 Luis de Figueroa, Roman Catholic monk